KTAR may refer to:

 KTAR (AM), a radio station (620 AM) licensed to Phoenix, Arizona.
 KTAR-FM, a radio station (92.3 FM) licensed to Glendale, Arizona.
 KMVP-FM, a radio station (98.7 FM) licensed to Glendale, Arizona, which formerly used the call sign KTAR-FM.
 KPNX, a television station (channel 12) licensed to Mesa, Arizona, which used the call sign KTAR-TV until 1979.
 Kolej Tunku Abdul Rahman